The West Schoolhouse is a historic school building in Wilmington, Massachusetts.  It is the best-preserved of Wilmington's remaining one-room schoolhouses.  This single story wood-frame building was probably (based on stylistic analysis) built in the 1860s or 1870s, although its resemblance in form to the c. 1840s Old Centre Schoolhouse suggests a possible earlier construction date and subsequent remodeling.  It has simple Greek Revival styling with rope molding on the corner boards, and transom windows over the pair of entry doors.

The building was listed on the National Register of Historic Places in 1990.

See also
National Register of Historic Places listings in Middlesex County, Massachusetts

References

Schoolhouses in Massachusetts
Schools in Middlesex County, Massachusetts
School buildings on the National Register of Historic Places in Massachusetts
Buildings and structures in Wilmington, Massachusetts
National Register of Historic Places in Middlesex County, Massachusetts